National Highway 352W, commonly referred to as Gurgaon-Pataudi Road or NH 352W is a national highway in  India. It is a spur road of National Highway 352 from Narwana to Rewari, which itself is a spur road of National Highway 52.  NH 352W traverses only one state, the state of Haryana in India.

History
It was a two-lane state highway, SH 26, in Haryana before it was decided to convert it into a 4-lane national highway in the year 2018 to provide an alternative NH to Delhi-Jaipur highway or National Highway 48, from Gurgaon to Rewari via Pataudi. Land acquisition took many years and the actual widening of the highway started only in the last quarter of 2021 and may complete by the end of 2023. The national highway will bypass Pataudi town.

It also connects Dwarka Expressway, NH 248-BB, near Harsaru and to Delhi airport via Dwarka Expressway.

Route 
NH 352W connects Rewari, Kakoria, Chillar, Maujabad, Pataudi, Jamalpur, Wazirpur, Harsaru and Gurgaon.

Junctions  
 
  Terminal near Rewari.
  or Dwarka Expressway near Harsaru.
  Terminal near Gurugram.

See also 
 List of National Highways in India
 List of National Highways in India by state

References

External links 

 NH 352W on OpenStreetMap

National highways in India
National Highways in Haryana